Rawi Tama Cundy (15 August 1901 – 9 February 1955) was a New Zealand rugby union player. A utility back, Cundy represented Wairarapa, at provincial level, and was a member of the New Zealand national side, the All Blacks, in 1929. He played six matches for the All Blacks, including one international. In 1927 he became the first player to score 100 points in a New Zealand first-class season.

Cundy was educated at Nelson College from 1916 to 1919.

References

1901 births
1955 deaths
New Zealand rugby union players
New Zealand international rugby union players
People educated at Nelson College
People from Featherston, New Zealand
Rugby union players from the Wellington Region